Kizuna Encounter: Super Tag Battle is a 1996 weapon-based fighting game produced by SNK for the Neo Geo arcade and home platform. It is the sequel to Savage Reign. The European Neo-Geo home cartridge PAL release was rare, with only five known copies, making it a sought-after item in video game collecting (the Japanese AES version is not rare and is identical except for the packaging and inserts).

Like its predecessor, it was ported to PlayStation 2 (released in Japan only), this compilation was re-released in the PlayStation Store for PlayStation 4 in December 2016. The Neo Geo version was released for the Wii Virtual Console in Japan on June 28, 2011.

Gameplay

The Kizuna Encounter fighting system is similar to the Real Bout Fatal Fury fighting system. Notable additions include the tag system, in which players have the ability to switch characters in-game by pressing the tag button while standing in their team's tag area. If a player loses one character, regardless of their other character's vitality, they lose the match. A roll system similar to the one used in The King of Fighters is also present in Kizuna Encounter as well.

Plot
One year ago, King Leo had made and held the Battle of the Beast God tournament in order to see who was worthy enough to challenge and fight against him from within their own given time and opportunity. Nine fighters had entered the tournament upon sight and that each of them had battled against one another from within a strong and relentless manner, but in the end, Sho Hayate had proven to be the strongest warrior and that he had won the tournament while defeating both King Leo and his fake impersonator King Lion from within the finals of the competition. To seek revenge against Hayate and those who caused his humiliating downfall, King Leo has organized a second version of the Battle of the Beast God tournament, but this time, there's a new rule: teams of two people must work together from within this new tournament so that they can either ensure victory or face defeat. The competitors from last year's tournament have learned of King Leo's new tournament and that each of them have decided to join forces with each other on either friendly or temporary terms. With the exception of Carol Stanzack (who decides to skip the tournament in order to continue her gymnastics training) and Nicola Zaza (who's too busy in having to work on his latest scientific project), Hayate and the fighters from the previous tournament have returned for combat and that they're ready to face the latest challenge that's presented to them by King Leo. However, the previous fighters aren't the only ones from within this tournament, as two new challengers have entered into the fray as well and that they have their own reasons in participating from within King Leo's new competition. The gathered fighters must be ready and prepared to not only fight against each other and King Leo from within this tournament, but also, they must deal with an unknown threat that lies directly from within the shadows of this competition as well.

Characters

Returning characters
Chung Paifu
Gordon Bowman
Gozu
Joker
King Lion
Max Eagle
Mezu
Sho Hayate

New characters
Rosa - A young woman who wields a sword in combat and leads a strong resistance force against King Leo. When her young brother and a couple of her friends are kidnapped by King Leo, Rosa heads to the tournament in the hopes of defeating King Leo and saving her comrades. 
Kim Sue Il - A young Korean police detective who uses taekwondo and wields a staff. He is investigating Joker's involvement in the tournament and seeks to not only arrest him, but also to disband his gang, the Looly Po Po. It is heavily implied that Sue Il is a descendant of Kim Kaphwan from the Fatal Fury and The King of Fighters series (sharing some of his ancestor's traits,  specifically a strong sense of justice, similar appearance, and many fighting skills and techniques). His name is translated as "Kim Young-Mok" in the game.

Bosses
King Leo (Sub-Boss)
Jyazu (Final Boss) - A mysterious fighter with a golden crow helmet known for his cruelty and sadism, he dresses in a black variant of Gozu and Mezu's attire and fights using a pair of golden claws and some of Gozu and Mezu's own moves; as the leader of the terrorist organization, The Jaguar, Jyazu's background is shrouded in mystery and his intentions are unknown. He can also transform into a demonic humanoid crow at will and can mask his evil intent from his enemies, giving him an unfair advantage.

See also
Savage Reign

Notes

References

External links 
 Kizuna Encounter at GameFAQs
 Kizuna Encounter at Giant Bomb
 Kizuna Encounter at Killer List of Videogames
 Kizuna Encounter at MobyGames

1996 video games
ACA Neo Geo games
Arcade video games
D4 Enterprise games
Fighting games
2D fighting games
Multiplayer and single-player video games
Neo Geo games
Nintendo Switch games
PlayStation Network games
PlayStation 4 games
Science fiction video games
SNK games
SNK Playmore games
Tag team videogames
Video game sequels
Virtual Console games
Windows games
Xbox One games
Video games developed in Japan
Hamster Corporation games